Krama Yudha Tiga Berlian or KTB Palembang was an Indonesian semi-professional association football club from Palembang, South Sumatra. The club was owned by the Palembang branch of Krama Yudha Tiga Berlian Motors, the local distributor of Mitsubishi Motors and Mitsubishi Fuso vehicles.

History 
Abdul Kadir coached the Krama Yudha Tiga Berlian and helped them finish third in the 1985–86 Asian Club Championship. When Krama Yudha Tiga Berlian joined in Group A along with Al-Ahli and Kingfisher East Bengal, Krama Yudha Tiga Berlian finished second in the group stage to ensure qualification for the semi-final. In the semi-final, Krama Yudha Tiga Berlian lost 3–0 to the Daewoo Royals. In the third place playoff match, Krama Yudha defeated Al-Ittihad 1–0. The club dissolved in 1991 due to financial difficulties.

The namesake company was split in 2017 where sales and production of Mitsubishi passenger cars were spun off to a new company, Mitsubishi Motors Krama Yudha Indonesia, leaving PT Krama Yudha Tiga Berlian with sales and production of Mitsubishi Fuso trucks.

Honours

Domestic 
 Galatama
 Champions: 1985, 1986–87
 Runners-up: 1990
 Piala Liga
 Winners: 1987, 1988, 1989

Continental 
 Asian Club Championship
 Third-place: 1985–86

Notable players
  Bambang Nurdiansyah
  Herry Kiswanto
  Rully Nere
  Zulkarnain Lubis

References 

Football clubs in Indonesia
Association football clubs established in 1984
Association football clubs disestablished in 1991
1991 disestablishments in Indonesia
Defunct football clubs in Indonesia